The 2016 Louisville City FC season is the club's second season playing in Louisville, Kentucky in the United Soccer League (USL), in the third tier of the United States soccer league system.

Background 

The club was formed in 2014 when its United Soccer League license was acquired from Orlando City by minority owner Wayne Estopinal. Louisville City is treated as a unique and new team, with the previous team's history claimed by its Major League Soccer successor, Orlando City SC.

Squad information 
As of October 1, 2016

Competitions

Friendlies

United Soccer League 

All times in regular season on Eastern Daylight Time (UTC-04:00)

Results summary

Results 

Schedule source

Standings 
Eastern Conference

USL Playoffs

Results

U.S. Open Cup 

Louisville City entered the 2016 U.S. Open Cup with the rest of the United Soccer League in the second round.

Player statistics

Top scorers

Assist leaders

Clean sheets

Disciplinary

Media 
As with the rest of the USL, all of Louisville City FC's USL matches will appear on YouTube.  There is also a weekly Radio show on 790 WKRD.

See also 
 2016 in American soccer
 2016 USL season
 Louisville City FC

References 

2016 USL season
2016
American soccer clubs 2016 season
2016 in sports in Kentucky